HMS Investigator was a survey sloop of the Royal Navy. She was purchased in 1823 for service in Indian waters.

On 1 November 1825 the eight-man crew of Investigator′s tender, the cutter Star, abandoned Star in the North Sea; the British merchant ship  rescued them. On 8 November 1825, Investigator herself was "wrecked" in the North Sea, but she survived and reached Harwich, Essex, England, on 11 November 1825.

Investigator′s fate is unknown.

References

 

 

1823 ships
Survey vessels of the Royal Navy
Maritime incidents in November 1825